X Factor Adria is a Balkan production of international talent show franchise of The X Factor. The Adria edition of the show covers Bosnia and Herzegovina, Croatia, North Macedonia, Montenegro and Serbia
After the first series the original production company lost their licence which was then acquired by Prva, Serbian broadcaster and production company. It was revealed that Croatian broadcaster RTL was interested in bringing the show to Croatia as well, and that would broadcast it.
In late February 2015 it was announced that Aleksandra Kovač, Massimo, Tonči Huljić and Željko Joksimović would judge the series. Shortly after that Antonija Blaće, Sneža Velkov and Aleksandar Radojičić would take the roles of show hosts.
The season premiered on 22 March 2015.

Selection process

Auditions
Contestants were able to apply via text messages or by filling up the form online. Pre-auditions were held from 2 February, until 15 February in Skopje, Podgorica, Split, Zagreb, Banja Luka, Sarajevo, Novi Sad, and Belgrade. During the pre-auditions more than 11,500 contestants performed for the show producers.

Bootcamp
Bootcamp was the second phase of the competition. There were two episodes of Bootcamp. The first one was with the boys and over 27s and the other was with the girls and groups. Each judge had to pick six acts to the judges houses. The six-seat challenge involved successful contestants being offered one of "six seats", representing places at the judges' houses stage of the competition. However, if a judge had already chosen six acts for their category, they could replace them if they preferred a later act.

The 24 acts that progressed to the judges houses:
Boys: Milan Bukilić, Antonio Krištofić, Ilija Mihailović, Boban Mojsovski, David Temelkov, Siniša Vidović
Girls: Marija Belada, Magdalena Bogić, Iva Ćurić, Antonia Dora Pleško, Katarina Simić, Tijana Vlajković
Over 27s: Amel Ćurić, Jelena Đurić, Almir Ismaili, Srđan Lazić, Nikola Marjanović, Danijela Večerinović
Groups: 9 Control, Adnan & Tarik, AnđeliNE, Highway, Infinitas, U La La

Judges' houses

Second chance
At the end of the first Judges' houses episode it was announced that the public would be given a chance to bring back a contestant that was eliminated and therefore did not make it to their respective judges' final three. After the votes have been cast and counted, the act with the most votes will come back on the first live show and stay in the competition alongside other 12 contestants estasts. After the second performance on the first live show it was announced that Adnan & Tarik had won the second chance. However, at the end of the first live show it was announced that Highway, Milan Bukilić and Boban Mojskovski got a second chance too. Towards the end of the third live show, it was announced that Danijela Večerinović will be the fifth act to get a second chance.

Contestants

Key:
 – Winner
 – Runner-up
 – Third place

Live shows
The first live show episode is set to be broadcast on 17 May 2015.

The Final

Result summary 
Colour key

 In the fourth week the contestants were divided into two groups, but unlike in previous weeks, the results were gathered, and the two contestants with the lowest number of votes left competition, while the contestants ranked from seventh to tenth place were in the sing-off. Production has not announced that duels were joined. Competitors are marked with 1 are performed on June 7, and the competitors marked with 2 on June 8.

Live show details

Week 1 (17 May)
Theme: Judges' choice
Group performance: "Let Me Entertain You"
Musical guest: Måns Zelmerlöw ("Heroes")

Judges' votes to eliminate
Huljić: Couldn't make a decision, as two of his groups were in the bottom two.
Joksimović: Infinitas
Kovač: AnđeliNE
Savić: Infinitas

Week 2 (24–25 May)
Theme: Eurovision hits

(Live 2)
Group performance: "Lane moje"
Musical guest: Roma Sijam ("Nasti adjikare")

(Live 3)
Group performance: "Hajde da ludujemo"
Musical guest: Knez ("Adio"), Lana Jurčević ("Ludo ljeto")

Judges' votes to eliminate (Live 2)
Joksimović: Nikola Marjanović
Kovač: Nikola Marjanović
Savić: Milan Bukilić
Huljić: Nikola Marjanović

Judges' votes to eliminate (Live 3)
Kovač: AnđeliNE
Joksimović: AnđeliNE
Savić: Ilija Mihailović
Huljić: Ilija Mihailović

Week 3 (31 May-1 June)
Theme: Love songs

(Live 4)
Group performance: 
Musical guest: Magazin ("Doktore"), Massimo Savić ("Kladim se na nas")

(Live 5)
Group performance: 
Musical guest: Sars ("Lutka"), Elena Risteska ("Doživotno")

Judges' votes to eliminate (Live 4)
Joksimović: Jelena Đurić
Huljić: Jelena Đurić
Kovač: Katarina Simić
Savić: Katarina Simić

Judges' votes to eliminate (Live 5)
Kovač: Danijela Večerinović
Joksimović: Danijela Večerinović
Savić: Milan Bukilić
Huljić: Milan Bukilić

Week 4 (7-8 June)
Theme: Contestants' choice

(Live 6)
Group performance: 
Musical guest: Vanna ("Tek je 12 sati") / ("Lopov"), Petar Grašo ("Moje zlato")
(Live 7)
Group performance: 
Musical guest: Saša Kovačević ("Gde smo moja ljubavi"), Karolina Gočeva ("Koj da mi zapee")

Judges' votes to eliminate (Duel 1)
Joksimović: Ilija Mihailović
Huljić: Ilija Mihailović
Kovač: Antonio Krištofić
Savić: Antonio Krištofić

Judges' votes to eliminate (Duel 2)
Kovač: Highway
Joksimović: David Temelkov
Savić: David Temelkov
Huljić: David Temelkov

Week 5 (14 June)
(Live 8)
Theme: Songs with dedication
Group performance: 
Musical guest: Lukijan Ivanović ("Hajde voli me.."), Jacques Houdek ("Nov čovjek"), Slavko Kalezić ("Feel the love"), Vlaho Arbulić ("Bla Bla ")

Judges' votes to eliminate (Live 8)
Huljić: Magdalena Bogić
Kovač: Adnan & Tarik
Joksimović: Adnan & Tarik
Savić: Adnan & Tarik

Week 6 (21 June)
(Live 9)
Theme: 
Group performance: 
Musical guest: James Arthur ("Recovery", "Impossible"), Jelena Rozga ("Kraljica"), Željko Joksimović ("Ranjena zver"), Aleksandra Kovač ("Da li nekada sanjaš san"), Tonči Huljić & Madre Badessa feat. Massimo ("Fuman")

Episodes

References 

Serbia
2015 Serbian television seasons